(Indonesian for 'fried flat noodle') is an Indonesian style of stir fried flat rice noodle dish. In Asia,  is available in two forms, dried and fresh. Its recipe is quite similar to another Chinese Indonesian favourite, with the exception of replacing yellow wheat noodles for flat rice noodles.

Ubiquitous in Indonesia,  is sold by many food vendors, from traveling street-hawkers in their carts to high-end restaurants.

Indonesian  usually tastes mildly sweet with a generous addition of sweet soy sauce, spicier with the addition of sambal chili sauce as condiment, and mostly using halal chicken and beef instead of pork and lard to cater to the Muslim majority population.

Origin
The dish is derived from Chinese stir-fried  and believed to have been introduced by Chinese immigrants in Indonesia over several centuries. The Chinese first made contact with Indonesia in the 7th century, and by the 1600s Chinese settlements had sprung up along the coasts of Java and Sumatra. Centuries of interactions between the two cultures resulted in the blending of Chinese and local cuisine. Kwetiau goreng may be served with sweet soy sauce that adds mild sweetness, or a sprinkle of bawang goreng fried shallots, or sambal to add spiciness. Kwetiau goreng may have a  topping to add a crispy texture, and not contain pork or lard to cater for Muslims.

Variations

Just like ,  recipes might vary according to its ingredients. The  (hot and spicy) uses a lot of chili pepper, while  mainly uses vegetables.

Another variant called  is similar to  but moister and softer with the addition of more water.

See also 

 Kwetiau ayam
 Mie ayam
 Beef kway teow
 Pad see ew
 List of noodle dishes
 Rice noodles

References

External links

 Indonesian Beef Kwetiau Goreng Recipe
 

Indonesian Chinese cuisine
Indonesian noodle dishes
Fried noodles